Vereniki Sauturaga Racagi (born Suva, 18 November 1982) is a Fijian rugby union player. He plays as a hooker.

Career
His present team is Fiji Warriors. He was selected for the Fijian squad for the 2007 Rugby World Cup finals, he played in three matches. He has been selected into the Fiji squad for the 2008 IRB Pacific Nations Cup. He currently holds 6 caps for his National Team.

External links
 Fiji profile
 Scrum profile

1982 births
Living people
Fijian rugby union players
Rugby union hookers
Fiji international rugby union players
Sportspeople from Suva
I-Taukei Fijian people